Ştefan Petrescu (1 July 1931 – 1993) was a Romanian pistol shooter. He won a gold medal in the 25 rapid-fire event at the 1956 Olympics and placed third at the 1958 World Championships.

Petrescu took up shooting in 1949 and retired in 1965 to become a shooting instructor.

References

External links 

 
 
 

1931 births
1993 deaths
People from Râmnicu Sărat
Romanian male sport shooters
ISSF pistol shooters
Shooters at the 1956 Summer Olympics
Shooters at the 1960 Summer Olympics
Olympic shooters of Romania
Olympic gold medalists for Romania
Olympic medalists in shooting
Medalists at the 1956 Summer Olympics
Date of death missing